|}

The Challow Novices' Hurdle is a Grade 1 National Hunt hurdle race in Great Britain which is open to horses aged four years or older. It is run at Newbury over a distance of about 2 miles and 4½ furlongs (2 miles 4 furlongs and 118 yards, or 4,131 metres), and during its running there are ten hurdles to be jumped. The race is for novice hurdlers, and it is scheduled to take place each year in late December. Prior to 1999 the race was sometimes run in early January. Initially contested as a two mile juvenile hurdle (restricted to horses who were three years old at the start of the season), the race was opened to older horses from the 1981–82 season onwards. After a hiatus during the mid 1990s, juvenile hurdlers are now excluded from the race.

Records
Leading jockey since 1971 (6 wins):
 Tony McCoy – Classified (2001), Coolnagorna (2002), Wichita Lineman (2006), Backspin (2010), Taquin du Seuil (2012), Captain Cutter (2013) 

Leading trainer since 1971 (5 wins):
 Paul Nicholls - Cornish Rebel (2003), Denman (2006), Bravemansgame (2020), Stage Star (2021), Hermes Allen (2022)

Winners since 1970–71
 actual year of race highlighted in bold – when in January, the minimum age is 5-y-o
{| class = "sortable" | border="1" style="border-collapse: collapse; font-size:90%"
|-  style="background:#7d7; text-align:center;"
! style="width:81px;"| Season
! style="width:160px;"| Winner
! style="width:40px;"| Age
! style="width:180px;"| Jockey
! style="width:180px;"| Trainer
|-
| 1970–1971
| True Luck
| 4
| Ken White
| Fred Rimell
|-
| 1971–1972
| Official
| 3
| Clive Bailey
| Toby Balding
|-
| 1972–1973
| Glorious Fifteenth
| 3
| Terry Biddlecombe
| Ron Smyth
|-
| 1973–1974
| Ashendene
| 3
| Redvers Weaver
| George Vergette
|-
| 1974–1975
| Benroy
| 3
| David Mould
| Haynes
|-
| 1975–1976
| Havanus
| 4
| Bob Davies
| David Morley
|- style="background:#eee;"
| 1976–1977Abandoned due to Frost || || |
|-
| 1977–1978
| Pollerton
| 3
| Steve Smith-Eccles
| Harry Thomson Jones
|-
| 1978–1979
| Snowtown Boy
| 3
| Roger Rowell
| Auriol Sinclair
|-
| 1979–1980
| Celtic Isle
| 3
| Eddie Woods
| Fred Rimell
|-
| 1980–1981
| Highway
| 4
| Bob Davies
| David Morley
|-
| 1981–1982
| Right Regent
| 4
| Colin Brown
| David Elsworth
|-
| 1982–1983
| Ambiance
| 4
| Peter Scudamore
| Peter Bailey
|-
| 1983–1984
| Catch Phrase
| 5
| Peter Double
| Josh Gifford
|-
| 1984–1985
| The Breener
| 5
| Simon Sherwood
| Oliver Sherwood
|- style="background:#eee;"
| 1985–1986Abandoned due to Frost || || |
|-
| 1986–1987
| Bonanza Boy
| 6
| Peter Hobbs
| Philip Hobbs
|-
| 1987–1988
| Slalom
| 7
| John White
| Michael Robinson
|-
| 1988–1989
| Green Willow
| 6
| Peter Hobbs
| Josh Gifford
|-
| 1989–1990
| Forest Sun
| 4
| Jimmy Frost
| Toby Balding
|-
| 1990–1991
| Tyrone Bridge
| 4
| Richard Dunwoody
| Martin Pipe
|-
| 1991–1992
| Lift and Load
| 4
| Graham McCourt
| Richard Hannon Sr.
|-
| 1992–1993
| Lord Relic
| 7
| Peter Scudamore
| Martin Pipe
|-
| 1993–1994
| Large Action
| 6
| Jamie Osborne
| Oliver Sherwood
|-
| 1994–1995
| Berude Not To
| 5
| Jamie Osborne
| Oliver Sherwood
|- style="background:#eee;"
| 1995–1996Abandoned due to Frost || || |
|- style="background:#eee;"
| 1996–1997Abandoned due to Frost || || |
|- style="background:#eee;"
| 1997–1998Abandoned due to Waterlogging || || |
|-
| 1998–1999
| King's Road
| 6
| Carl Llewellyn
| Nigel Twiston-Davies
|-
| 1999–2000
| Bindaree 
| 5
| Carl Llewellyn
| Nigel Twiston-Davies
|- style="background:#eee;"
| 2000–2001Abandoned due to Frost and Snow || || |
|-
| 2001–2002
| Classified
| 5
| Tony McCoy
| Martin Pipe
|-
| 2002–2003
| Coolnagorna
| 5
| Tony McCoy
| Jonjo O'Neill
|-
| 2003–2004
| Cornish Rebel
| 6
| Ruby Walsh
| Paul Nicholls
|-
| 2004–2005
| Brewster
| 7
| David Dennis
| Ian Williams
|-
| 2005–2006
| Denman 
| 6
| Ruby Walsh
| Paul Nicholls
|-
| 2006–2007
| Wichita Lineman
| 5
| Tony McCoy
| Jonjo O'Neill
|-
| 2007–2008
| Souffleur
| 4
| Tom O'Brien
| Peter Bowen
|-
| 2008–2009
| Diamond Harry
| 5
| Timmy Murphy
| Nick Williams
|-
|2009–2010
| Reve de Sivola
| 4
| Daryl Jacob
| Nick Williams
|-
|2010-2011
| Backspin
| 5
| Tony McCoy
| Jonjo O'Neill
|-
| |2011-2012
| Fingal Bay
| 5
| Richard Johnson
| Philip Hobbs
|-
| |2012-2013
| Taquin du Seuil
| 5
| Tony McCoy
| Jonjo O'Neill
|-
| |2013-2014
| Captain Cutter
| 6
| Tony McCoy
| Nicky Henderson
|-
| |2014-2015
| Parlour Games
| 6
| Noel Fehily
| John Ferguson
|-
| |2015-2016
| Barters Hill
| 5
| David Bass
| Ben Pauling
|-
| |2016-2017
| Messire Des Obeaux
| 4
| Daryl Jacob
| Alan King
|-
| |2017-2018
| Poetic Rhythm
| 6
| Paddy Brennan
| Fergal O'Brien
|-
| |2018-2019
| Champ
| 6
|Barry Geraghty
|Nicky Henderson
|-
| |2019-2020
| Thyme Hill
| 5
| Richard Johnson
| Philip Hobbs
|-
| |2020-2021
| Bravemansgame
| 5
| Harry Cobden
| Paul Nicholls
|-
| |2021-2022
| Stage Star
| 5
| Harry Cobden
| Paul Nicholls
|-
| |2022-2023
| Hermes Allen
| 5
| Harry Cobden
| Paul Nicholls
|}

See also
 Horse racing in Great Britain
 List of British National Hunt races

References
 Racing Post:
 
 pedigreequery.com – Challow Novices' Hurdle – Newbury.

Specific

National Hunt races in Great Britain
Newbury Racecourse
National Hunt hurdle races